Hydrophorus is a genus of flies in the family Dolichopodidae.

Species

The following are synonyms of other species:
Hydrophorus albosignatus Ringdahl, 1919: Synonym of Hydrophorus callosoma Frey, 1915
Hydrophorus wahlgreni Frey, 1915: Synonym of Hydrophorus altivagus Aldrich, 1911

References

 
Dolichopodidae genera
Hydrophorinae
Taxa named by Carl Fredrik Fallén